Aluminium carbonate (Al2(CO3)3), is a carbonate of aluminium. It is not well characterized; one authority says that simple carbonates of aluminium are not known. However related compounds are known, such as the basic sodium aluminium carbonate mineral dawsonite (NaAlCO3(OH)2) and hydrated basic aluminium carbonate minerals scarbroite (Al5(CO3)(OH)13•5(H2O)) and hydroscarbroite (Al14(CO3)3(OH)36•nH2O).

Preparation
There is no evidence that aluminium carbonate is formed in double displacement reactions; soluble carbonates are sufficiently alkaline to precipitate aluminium hydroxide and produce carbon dioxide. 

Uses
Aluminium carbonate, along with aluminium hydroxide and aluminium oxide, is a phosphate-binding drug that is sometimes administered to dogs and cats to bind intestinal phosphate and prevent the absorption of dietary phosphate as well as to decrease absorption of phosphate excreted by the pancreas.  It is seldom used in humans because of concerns with toxicity, but cats and dogs do not appear to have a toxic response to its presence.

The reaction of aluminium sulfate and sodium bicarbonate forms carbon dioxide and aluminium hydroxide which stabilises the formation of a foam. This reaction was the basis of an early fire extinguisher invented by Aleksandr Loran in 1904.

References 

Aluminium compounds
Carbonates